Methaniazide/thioacetazone, sold under the brand name Neothetazone, is an antibiotic combination of methaniazide (neotizide) and thioacetazone that is or was very commonly used in the treatment of tuberculosis. It has been implicated as a cause of gigantomastia in a single 1970 case report, and, along with D-penicilliamine, bucillamine, ciclosporin, and indinavir, is one of the only drugs to have been associated with gigantomastia.

See also
 Conteben
 Isoniazid

References

Antibiotics
Combination drugs
Anti-tuberculosis drugs